Violet blue may refer to:

 Violet blue, a color that is a tone of Indigo
 RAL 5000 Violet blue, a RAL color
 Violet Blue, author and sex educator
 Noname Jane (born 1977), pornographic actress known in the majority of her movies as Violet Blue
 Violet Blue (album), a 1993 album by Japanese singer-songwriter Chara
 "Violet Blue", a song from Jill Jones (album) by Jill Jones
 Lepidochrysops violetta, a butterfly found in Zimbabwe
 "Violet Blue", a song by English singer Kyla La Grange

See also
 Violets Are Blue (disambiguation)
 Violent Blue, a 2011 film
 The Violent Blue, a 2008 album by Electric President